Zoran Banović (born 14 October 1977) is a former Montenegrin football goalkeeper.

Club career
Banović started to play football in his home town Nikšić in local club FK Sutjeska. Between 2004 and 2008 he was part of the notable Serbian club Crvena zvezda. For four years in Zvezda Banović earned 17 appearances in the Serbian SuperLiga.

In February 2009 Banović was invited by Bulgarian side Spartak Varna to join the club for a trial period, which began on 17 February. He made his team debut a few days later, in a 1-0 friendly win against PFC Svetkavitsa. On 22 February Spartak signed Banović to a one-a-half-year deal.

In 2009, he returned to Montenegro where has represented FK Otrant, FK Mornar, FK Budućnost Podgorica and FK Čelik Nikšić.

International career
In 2004 Banović played 90 minutes for Serbia and Montenegro national team in a friendly match against Northern Ireland.

In 2007, he was expected to be called up for Montenegro's inaugural match against Hungary but he never got the call from head coach Zoran Filipović, mainly due to his rare occasions to prove himself at Red Star Belgrade at that time.

Honours
Red Star
First League of Serbia and Montenegro: 2005–06
Serbian SuperLiga: 2006–07
Serbian Cup: 2006–07

Čelik Nikšić
Montenegrin Cup: 2011–12
Montenegrin Second League: 2011–12

References

External links
 
 Zoran Banović at FSCG.co.me

1977 births
Living people
Footballers from Nikšić
Association football goalkeepers
Serbia and Montenegro footballers
Serbia and Montenegro international footballers
Montenegrin footballers
FK Sutjeska Nikšić players
Red Star Belgrade footballers
PFC Spartak Varna players
FK Mornar players
FK Budućnost Podgorica players
FK Čelik Nikšić players
First League of Serbia and Montenegro players
Serbian SuperLiga players
First Professional Football League (Bulgaria) players
Montenegrin Second League players
Montenegrin First League players
Montenegrin expatriate footballers
Expatriate footballers in Bulgaria
Montenegrin expatriate sportspeople in Bulgaria